Opodiphthera helena, the Helena gum moth,  is a moth in the family Saturniidae. It is found along the eastern coast of Australia.

The larvae feed on Eucalyptus species.

References

Opodiphthera
Moths of Australia
Moths described in 1843